UPMC Nowlan Park is the principal Gaelic Athletic Association stadium in Kilkenny, Ireland. Named after James Nowlan (the longest serving President of the GAA), the stadium hosts major hurling matches and is home to the Kilkenny hurling team. It opened in 1927 replacing St. James Park.

Facilities
The stadium consists of the following stands:
Old Stand (O'Loughlin Road) mainly bench-seats (uncovered, planning for a new roof submitted after storm damaged old roof in 2014) (New roof completed in late 2014 and opened in early 2015)
Paddy Grace Stand (New Stand, Hebron Road) mainly bench-seats (covered)
Ted Carrol Stand (country end) 4,000 plastic seats (covered) 
City Terrace (covered) 
The target capacity under the Kilkenny GAA 2010-15 plan was 30,000. A large portion of the Old Stand's roof was blown off during a violent storm on 12 February 2014. The rest was removed for health and safety reasons.

Hurling
History was made at Nowlan Park on 7 June 2014 when Kilkenny versus Offaly was broadcast on Sky Sports, the first time a Championship fixture of any kind was broadcast live to a UK-wide audience. British viewers were reported to have been "amazed and confused [...] bemused but impressed [...] amused and confounded" after catching a glimpse of the teatime action.

Other uses

Nowlan Park also serves as a concert venue, with festivals featuring world-famous performers such as Andrea Bocelli, Rod Stewart, Bob Dylan, Paul Simon, Bryan Ferry, James Taylor, Shania Twain, Dolly Parton, and in July 2013 it played host to the European tour finale of Bruce Springsteen.
Nowlan Park was included in Ireland's bid to host the 2023 Rugby World Cup.

During the COVID-19 pandemic, Nowlan Park was used as a drive-through test centre.

See also
 List of Gaelic Athletic Association stadiums
 List of stadiums in Ireland

References

Gaelic games grounds in the Republic of Ireland
Kilkenny GAA
Sports venues in County Kilkenny